Located in the French Pyrenees mountains, the Chemin de la Mâture is a  path carved into a sheer rock face rising over  above the river Gave d'Aspe. Completed by the engineer Paul-Marie Leroy in 1772, the Chemin de la Mâture (literally "The Mast Road") was originally created to transport timber from the nearby Pacq forest to be used in constructing French naval vessels. The path has since been incorporated into the GR 10, a long-distance footpath running along the Pyrenees from the Atlantic Ocean to the Mediterranean Sea.

The Chemin de la Mâture overlooks the Fort du Portalet and lies near the village of Etsaut, in the department of Pyrénées-Atlantiques. The area is popular for rock climbing.

External links
 Pyrenees walking site (in French)

Notes

Translated in part from the article of the same name on French Wikipedia

Hiking trails in France
Pyrenees
Geography of Pyrénées-Atlantiques
Tourist attractions in Pyrénées-Atlantiques
Transport in Nouvelle-Aquitaine